The 1878 Southampton by-election was fought on 14 June 1878.  The byelection was fought due to the death of the incumbent Conservative MP, Russell Gurney.  It was won by the Conservative candidate Alfred Giles.

References

1878 in England
1878 elections in the United Kingdom
Elections in Southampton
By-elections to the Parliament of the United Kingdom in Hampshire constituencies
19th century in Southampton